William Arnold Sime  (8 February 1909 – 5 May 1983) was a South African-born English barrister and judge who also played first-class cricket. Educated at Bedford School and at Balliol College, Oxford, he was a right-hand batsman and slow left-arm orthodox bowler.

He played first-class matches for the Minor Counties between 1929 and 1934, and Oxford University in 1931. He then joined Nottinghamshire in 1935 and stayed with them until 1950, captaining the club in his final three years.

Sime became a QC in 1957. He was Recorder of Grantham and was appointed a Circuit Judge in 1972.

References

External links
 

1909 births
1983 deaths
People from Mangaung Metropolitan Municipality
People educated at Bedford School
Alumni of Balliol College, Oxford
English cricketers
Nottinghamshire cricketers
Nottinghamshire cricket captains
Oxford University cricketers
South African emigrants to the United Kingdom
Bedfordshire cricketers
North v South cricketers
Minor Counties cricketers
20th-century King's Counsel
20th-century English judges
Members of the Order of the British Empire
Companions of the Order of St Michael and St George